Imaginotions; Truthless Tales is a collection of nineteen children's fantasy stories by Tudor Jenks. It was first published in hardcover by The Century Co. in 1894; the first British edition was published by T. Fisher Unwin in 1900. Illustrators included Reginald B. Birch, W. H. Drake, E. B. Bensell, Dan Beard, and Oliver Herford. The stories had previously been published in St. Nicholas Magazine between 1883 and 1894.

The collection was the author's second published book. The stories are typical of Jenks' early work, many being told in the first person and with an air of gentle irony.

Contents

External links
 Internet Archive e-text of the collection

1894 short story collections
American short story collections
Fantasy short story collections
Children's short story collections
American children's books
American fantasy
Works originally published in children's magazines
1890s children's books
The Century Company books